The 1993 Atlantic Coast Conference baseball tournament was held in Greenville, SC from May 15 through 20. Clemson won the tournament and earned the Atlantic Coast Conference's automatic bid to the 1993 NCAA Division I baseball tournament.

Seeding and format 
All nine teams qualified for the conference tournament, with several byes allowing for a nine-team double-elimination tournament.

From TheACC.com:
On Saturday (The Semifinals) of the ACC Baseball Tournament, the match-up between the four remaining teams is determined by previous opponents. If teams have played previously in the tournament, every attempt will be made to avoid a repeat match-up between teams, regardless of seed. If it is impossible to avoid a match-up that already occurred, then the determination is based on avoiding the most recent, current tournament match-up, regardless of seed. If no match-ups have occurred, the team left in the winners bracket will play the lowest seeded team from the losers bracket.

Seeding

Tournament

Bracket 

The brackets were set up without an elimination play-in game and several byes, which allowed all 9 teams to play in a double-elimination format. To clarify the brackets above, the match-ups (by round) to the reordered semifinals were as follows:
 1st Round: Maryland vs. Georgia Tech, Clemson vs. Duke, Florida State - bye, N.C. State vs. Virginia, North Carolina vs. Wake Forest
 2nd Round (winner's): Georgia Tech - bye, Clemson vs. Florida State, North Carolina vs. N.C. State
 2nd Round (loser's): Duke vs. Maryland, Virginia vs. Wake Forest
 3rd Round (winner's): Clemson vs. Georgia Tech, North Carolina - bye
 3rd Round (loser's): Duke vs. N.C. State, Florida State vs. Virginia
 4th Round (winner's): Clemson vs. North Carolina
 4th Round (loser's): N.C. State - bye, Florida State vs. Georgia Tech

All-Tournament Team

See also 
 College World Series
 NCAA Division I Baseball Championship

Sources 
 2007 ACC Baseball Media Guide 

Tournament
Atlantic Coast Conference baseball tournament
Atlantic Coast Conference baseball tournament
Atlantic Coast Conference baseball tournament
College baseball tournaments in South Carolina
Baseball competitions in Greenville, South Carolina